Jack O'Connell (born 1959) is an American author known for his noir crime and speculative fiction novels. He lives in Worcester, Massachusetts, with his wife, Nancy, and two children, Claire and James. He was a student, and now teaches, at College of the Holy Cross in Worcester.

Career

O'Connell has stated that the post-industrial urban decay of Worcester was an influence on Quinsigamond, the fictional city where his novels are set.

Bibliography

Novels

 Box Nine (Mysterious Press, 1992)
 Wireless (Mysterious Press, 1993)
 The Skin Palace (Mysterious Press, 1996)
 Word Made Flesh (Mysterious Press, 1999)
 The Resurrectionist (Algonquin Books, 2008)

Anthologies (as editor)

 Dark Alleys of Noir (Delta Productions, 2002)

Awards

 Shirley Jackson Award (2008, Finalist)
 Prix Mystère de la critique (2010, France)
 Grand Prix de l'Imaginaire (2010, France)

References

External links
 Interview with Worcester's Writers Project, 2011

Living people
1959 births
American speculative fiction writers